The Dummy is a phrase used as a title for several creative works, notable instances listed below.

 "The Dummy" (1962), an episode of The Twilight Zone television series
 The Dummy (1917 film), an American silent drama film
 The Dummy (1929 film), an American comedy film

See also 

 Dummy (disambiguation), where the listings above also appear